Michaela Konečná (born 6 July 1998) is a Czech handball player for Mosonmagyaróvári KC SE and the Czech national team.

She participated at the 2018 European Women's Handball Championship.

References

External links

1998 births
Living people
People from Hlučín
Czech female handball players
Sportspeople from the Moravian-Silesian Region